The University of Sierra Leone is the name of the former unitary public university system in Sierra Leone. Established in February 1827, it is the oldest university in Africa. 

As of May 2005, the University of Sierra Leone was reconstituted into the individual colleges of Fourah Bay College and Njala University college.

History 
It has its origins in the Fourah Bay College, which was established as an Anglican missionary school by the Church Missionary Society with support from Charles MacCarthy, the governor of Sierra Leone. Samuel Ajayi Crowther was the first student to enroll at Fouray Bay. Fourah Bay College soon became a magnet for Krio and other Africans seeking higher education in British West Africa. These included Nigerians, Ghanaians, Ivorians and many more, especially in the fields of theology and education. It was the first western-style university in West Africa. Under colonialism, Freetown was known as "the Athens of West Africa" as an homage to the college.

References

SL
Educational institutions established in 1827